The dune shearwater (Puffinus holeae), also known as the Canarian shearwater or Hole's shearwater, was a relatively large shearwater which bred in the Canary Islands archipelago of the North Atlantic Ocean.  Fossils have also been found in the Figueira Brava cave archaeological site on the western coast of Portugal.  The specific epithet honours Mrs Jean Hole, who collected fossil material of the species on the Jandia Peninsula of Fuerteventura.  It was intermediate in size between the Manx and Cory's shearwaters.  Its breeding colonies were in dune fields, in contrast to those of the smaller and sympatric lava shearwater which bred in lava fields.  The species went extinct about 2000–3000 years ago, contemporaneously with the first human settlement of the islands by the Guanches, likely due to be human predation.

References

Puffinus
Birds of the Canary Islands
Fossil taxa described in 1990
Late Quaternary prehistoric birds
Holocene extinctions
Birds described in 1990
Extinct birds of Atlantic islands